Francis Huntington (born November 29, 1952) is an American retired professional wrestler. He is best known for his appearances with the World Wrestling Federation (WWF) in the early 1980s under the ring name Jules Strongbow, where he held the WWF World Tag Team Championship on two occasions with his kayfabe brother, Chief Jay Strongbow.

Professional wrestling career

Early career (1973–1982)
Huntington debuted in 1973 as "Frank Hill", wrestling for professional wrestling promotions such as the American Wrestling Association.

In late 1979, he teamed with Wahoo McDaniel in the All Japan Pro Wrestling World's Strongest Tag Determination League tournament.

World Wrestling Federation (1982–1983)
In 1982, Huntington was hired by the World Wrestling Federation (WWF). He was renamed "Jules Strongbow" and placed into a tag team with Chief Jay Strongbow, who was billed as his brother. They formed a noted tag team, known as the Strongbows. On June 28, 1982, the Strongbows defeated the team of Mr. Fuji and Mr. Saito for their first WWF Tag Team Championship. On the July 13 edition of Championship Wrestling, the Strongbows lost the belts back to Fuji and Saito. On the October 26 edition of Championship Wrestling, the Strongbows defeated Fuji and Saito for their second tag title reign. They were defeated for the belts in Allentown, Pennsylvania, on the March 8, 1983, edition of Championship Wrestling by the Wild Samoans (Afa and Sika). Shortly after losing the title, Huntington left the WWF.

Independent circuit (1983–2001) 
After leaving the WWF, Huntington later competed on the independent circuit for several years, most notably in top independent promotions such as the Pennsylvania-based National Wrestling Federation and Ohio's International Wrestling Alliance. He even wrestled in World Class Championship Wrestling (WCCW) for a while. He retired in 2001.

Personal life 
Unlike Joe Scarpa, an Italian-American who wrestled as Chief Jay Strongbow, Huntington is an actual Native American from the Stockbridge–Munsee tribe of the Mohican Nation in Wisconsin.

Following his retirement from professional wrestling, Huntington volunteered with the Native American Students Association at Missouri State University.

Championships and accomplishments 
International Wrestling Association
IWA United States Heavyweight Championship (1 time)
National Wrestling Federation
NWF Heavyweight Championship (1 time)
NWF Tag Team Championship (2 times) – with Al Bold Eagle (1 time) and Navajo Warrior (1 time)
NWA Tri-State
NWA Tri-State Tag Team Championship (2 times) – with Terry Orndorff (1 time) and Eric Embry (1 time)
World Wrestling Federation
WWF World Tag Team Championship (2 times) – with Chief Jay Strongbow

Notes

References

External links
 
 
 Jay & Jules Strongbow Interview (April 2, 1983) via YouTube

1952 births
Living people
Sportspeople from Omaha, Nebraska
Professional wrestlers from Nebraska
American male professional wrestlers
Native American professional wrestlers